Victoria Gu is an American politician serving as a member of the Rhode Island Senate for the 38th district. Elected in November 2022, she assumed office on January 3, 2023.

Early life and education 
The daughter of immigrants from China, Gu was born in Illinois and raised in South Kingstown, Rhode Island. She earned a Bachelor of Arts degree in economics from Harvard University.

Career 
Outside of politics, Gu worked as a software engineer at LunaYou, a wellness startup. She also served as a member of the Charlestown Resiliency Commission. She was elected to the Rhode Island Senate in November 2022 and assumed office on January 3, 2023.

References 

Living people
Democratic Party Rhode Island state senators
Women state legislators in Rhode Island
American politicians of Chinese descent
Harvard University alumni
People from South Kingstown, Rhode Island
People from Washington County, Rhode Island
Year of birth missing (living people)